Ilya Vladimirovich Yeryomenko (born 24 November 1998) is a Russian football player. He plays for FC Irtysh Omsk.

Club career
He made his debut in the Russian Football National League for FC Irtysh Omsk on 1 August 2020 in a game against FC Yenisey Krasnoyarsk, as a starter.

References

External links
 
 Profile by Russian Football National League
 

1998 births
Sportspeople from Omsk
Living people
Russian people of Ukrainian descent
Russian footballers
Association football goalkeepers
FC Irtysh Omsk players
Russian First League players
Russian Second League players